Rawan Ella is a waterfall in the village of Uduhawara, in Badulla District, Sri Lanka. 

Rawan Ella falls has relation to Ravana stories. This waterfall is not to be confused with the Ravana Falls in Ella.

References

See also 
 List of waterfalls in Sri Lanka

Waterfalls of Sri Lanka
Landforms of Badulla District
Waterfalls in Uva Province